The 1931–32 season in Swedish football, starting August 1931 and ending July 1932:

Honours

Official titles

Competitions

Promotions, relegations and qualifications

Promotions

League transfers

Relegations

Domestic results

Allsvenskan 1931–32

Division 2 Norra 1931–32

Division 2 Södra 1931–32

Norrländska Mästerskapet 1932
Final

National team results

 Sweden: 

 Sweden: 

 Sweden: 

 Sweden: 

 Sweden: 

 Sweden: 

 Sweden: 

 Sweden: 

 Sweden: 

 Sweden: 

 Sweden:

National team players in season 1931–32

Notes

References
Print

Online

 
Seasons in Swedish football